Chedra inquisitor is a moth in the family Batrachedridae. It was described by Ronald W. Hodges in 1966 and is endemic to the US state of Illinois.

References

Batrachedridae
Moths described in 1966